Epiglypta is a monotypic genus of glass snails that is endemic to Australia’s Lord Howe Island in the Tasman Sea. The species is Epiglypta howeinsulae, also known as the ribbed glass snail; it has not been collected since 1920 and may be extinct due to rat predation.

Description
The shell of adult snails is 17–21 mm in height, with a diameter of 31.9–34.8 mm, subglobose with a moderately raised spire, with rounded whorls, impressed sutures and closely spaced radial ribs. It is yellowish-brown in colouration. The umbilicus is narrowly open in juveniles, closed by reflection in adults. The aperture is ovately lunate. It is identifiable by its large and distinctly ribbed shell.

Distribution and habitat
The snail's distribution was limited to the vicinity of the summits of the southern mountains of the island, where it was found beneath stones and on wet rock faces.

References

Helicarionidae
Monotypic gastropod genera
Taxa named by Henry Augustus Pilsbry
Gastropods described in 1893
Gastropods of Lord Howe Island